Marcel Lalu (24 March 1882 in Limoges – 3 May 1951 in Limoges) was a French gymnast who competed in the 1900 Summer Olympics, in the 1908 Summer Olympics, and in the 1912 Summer Olympics. In 1900 he finished eighth in the combined exercises competition which was the only Olympic gymnastic event. Eight years later he finished seventh in the 1908 all-around competition and at the 1912 Games he finished again seventh in the all-around contest.

References

External links

1882 births
1951 deaths
Sportspeople from Limoges
French male artistic gymnasts
Olympic gymnasts of France
Gymnasts at the 1900 Summer Olympics
Gymnasts at the 1908 Summer Olympics
Gymnasts at the 1912 Summer Olympics